Meghann Treacy (born June 5, 1993) is an Assistant Coach for Colby College, who is best known for her All-Star Goaltending for the University of Maine Black Bears women's team from the 2012–13 season to 2015–16.  She was a Hockey East First Team All-Star in the 2014–15 season. Prior to her college career, Treacy played ice hockey, lacrosse and field hockey at Williston Northampton School.

NCAA

Statistics source

References

1993 births
Living people
American women's ice hockey goaltenders
Maine Black Bears women's ice hockey players
Ice hockey coaches from New York (state)
Ice hockey players from New York (state)